Majvor Welander (15 February 1950 – January 2016) is a Swedish swimmer. She competed in the women's 400 metre freestyle at the 1964 Summer Olympics.

References

External links
 

1950 births
2016 deaths
Olympic swimmers of Sweden
Swimmers at the 1964 Summer Olympics
Swimmers from Stockholm
Swedish female freestyle swimmers